Iolaus djaloni, the Fouta Djalon sapphire, is a butterfly in the family Lycaenidae. It is found in Guinea. The habitat consists of dry forests.

Adults have been recorded on wing in October and December.

References

Butterflies described in 1998
Iolaus (butterfly)
Endemic fauna of Guinea
Butterflies of Africa